The 2011 NCAA Women's Gymnastics Championship was held in the Wolstein Center, at Cleveland, Ohio on April 15–17, 2011. Twelve teams from the six regional meets advanced to the NCAA Division I national team and individual titles. The Alabama Crimson Tide were the 2011 national champions.

Regional Championships were held on April 2, 2011 at the following six sites:
Ann Arbor Regional – Crisler Arena, 6 p.m. (ET) Ann Arbor, Michigan; Host: University of Michigan
 Finish: Michigan (1st), Kent State (2nd), Ohio State, Minnesota, Stanford, Iowa State
Athens Regional – Stegeman Coliseum, 4 p.m. (ET) Athens, Georgia; Host: University of Georgia
 Finish: UCLA (1st), Georgia (2nd), LSU, North Carolina State, Maryland, West Virginia
Corvallis Regional – Gill Coliseum, 7 p.m. (ET) Corvallis, Oregon; Host: Oregon State University
 Finish: Oregon State (1st), Nebraska (2nd), Michigan State, San Jose State, Iowa, Southern Utah
Denver Regional – Magness Arena, 8 p.m. (ET) Denver, Colorado; Host: University of Denver
 Finish: Arkansas (1st), Florida (2nd), Boise State, Denver, Arizona, Brigham Young
Norman Regional – Lloyd Noble Center, 5 p.m. (ET) Norman, Oklahoma; Host: University of Oklahoma
 Finish: Oklahoma (1st), Utah (2nd), Washington, North Carolina, New Hampshire, Missouri
Tuscaloosa Regional – Coleman Coliseum, 7 p.m. (ET) Tuscaloosa, Alabama; Host: University of Alabama, Tuscaloosa
 Finish: Alabama (1st), Illinois (2nd), Penn State, Auburn, Kentucky, Central Michigan

NCAA Women's Gymnastics Championship:
NCAA Championships, Cleveland, Ohio, April 15:
 Afternoon session (12:00 pm ET) – No. 2 seed UCLA, No. 3 Oklahoma (1st), No. 6 Michigan, No. 7 Georgia, No. 10 Arkansas and No. 11 Illinois
 Evening session (6 pm ET) – No. 1 seed Alabama (1st), No. 4 Oregon State, No. 5 Florida, No. 8 Utah, No. 9 Nebraska and No. 12 and host team Kent State.
 NCAA Championship (Super Six Finals), Cleveland, Ohio, April 16 (4 p.m. ET):
 Oklahoma, Michigan, UCLA, Alabama (1st), Nebraska, Utah
 Individual Event Finals – Cleveland, Ohio, Saturday, April 17 (1 p.m.):
 Vault – 1st, Marissa King, University of Florida, 9.8750; 2nd, Madison Mooring, University of Oklahoma, 9.8250; 3rd, Erin Davis, University of Nebraska, 9.8188
 Uneven Parallel Bars – 1st, Kat Ding, University of Georgia, 9.9125; 2nd, Jen Kesler, Oregon State University, 9.8750; 3rd, Sarah DeMeo, University of Alabama, 9.8625; 3rd, Makayla Stambaugh, Oregon State University, 9.8625; 3rd, Monique DeLaTorre, UCLA, 9.8625 
 Balance Beam – 1st, Sam Peszek, UCLA, 9.90; 2nd, Kayla Hoffman, University of Alabama, 9.8875; 2nd, Aisha Gerber, UCLA, 9.8875
 Floor Exercise – 1st, Geralen Stack-Eaton, University of Alabama, 9.9375; 2nd, Maranda Smith, University of Florida, 9.9000; 2nd, Kylee Botterman, University of Michigan, 9.9000; 2nd, Brittani McCullough, UCLA, 9.9000
 All around - Kylee Botterman, Michigan, 39.575

Champions 

Final Team Standings:
1. Alabama, 197.650
2. UCLA, 197.375
3. Oklahoma, 197.250
4. Nebraska, 196.725
5. Utah, 196.500
6. Michigan, 196.425
7. University of Florida, 196.125
7. Oregon State University, 196.100
9. University of Arkansas, 195.450 
9. University of Georgia, 195.450 
11. University of Illinois, 195.100
12. Kent State University, 195.000

References

External links
 NCAA Gymnastics Championship Official site

2011 NCAA Women's Gymnastics Championship 
NCAA Women's Gymnastics championship
2011 in American sports
NCAA Women's Gymnastics Championship